Elias Paul Huth (born 10 February 1997) is a German professional footballer who plays as a forward for  club Erzgebirge Aue.

Career
In June 2017, Huth joined 3. Liga club Rot-Weiß Erfurt on a season-long loan.

On 21 January 2022, Huth moved to Hallescher FC.

References

External links
 

Living people
1997 births
German footballers
Association football forwards
Hannover 96 II players
Hannover 96 players
FC Rot-Weiß Erfurt players
FSV Zwickau players
1. FC Kaiserslautern players
Hallescher FC players
FC Erzgebirge Aue players
2. Bundesliga players
Regionalliga players
3. Liga players
21st-century German people